Wayne Cooper may refer to:

Wayne Cooper (artist) (born 1942), Native American painter
Wayne Cooper (basketball) (1956–2022), American basketball player
Wayne Cooper (fashion designer), British-born fashion designer in Australia
Wayne Cooper (snooker player) (born 1978), English snooker player